Donnington may refer to:

Donnington, Berkshire
Donnington Castle
Donnington, Gloucestershire
Donnington, Herefordshire
Donnington, Oxfordshire, a suburb of Oxford
Donnington Bridge, a bridge over the River Thames
Donnington, Wroxeter and Uppington, Shropshire
Donnington, Telford, Shropshire
Donnington, West Sussex
Donnington (Chichester) (UK electoral ward)

See also 
 Donington (disambiguation)